Fernando Luis Báez Cruz (born 25 July 1941) is a Puerto Rican male former weightlifter, who competed in the 56 kg category and represented Puerto Rico at international competitions. He won the bronze medal in the press at the 1969 World Weightlifting Championships lifting 115.0 kg. He participated at the 1972 Summer Olympics in the 56 kg event. He set four bantamweight press world records.

References

Further reading
 
 
 All time finalists (Olympic Games)

1941 births
Living people
Puerto Rican male weightlifters
World Weightlifting Championships medalists
People from Adjuntas, Puerto Rico
Olympic weightlifters of Puerto Rico
Weightlifters at the 1960 Summer Olympics
Weightlifters at the 1964 Summer Olympics
Weightlifters at the 1968 Summer Olympics
Weightlifters at the 1972 Summer Olympics
World record setters in weightlifting
Pan American Games medalists in weightlifting
Pan American Games gold medalists for Puerto Rico
Pan American Games silver medalists for Puerto Rico
Pan American Games bronze medalists for Puerto Rico
Weightlifters at the 1967 Pan American Games
Weightlifters at the 1971 Pan American Games
Weightlifters at the 1975 Pan American Games
20th-century Puerto Rican people